Ludo Dierckxsens (born 14 October 1964 in Geel, Flanders) is a former Belgian racing cyclist.

1999 Tour de France
Ludo Dierckxsens won the 11th stage of the 1999 Tour de France. After this stage victory, Dierckxens went to take the obligatory doping tests. When the doctors asked him the routine question if he had taken any products which might cause a positive test result, Dierckxens replied that he had taken tetracosactide (Synacthen) in the Tour of Germany. He claimed to have a prescription for them, but his team  did not know about this, and sent him home a few days later. The doping tests returned negative.

Major results

1989
1st Brussel-Zepperen
1994
1st Izegem
1995
1st Geetbets
1st Mechelen
1st Wanzele
1996
1st GP Stad Vilvoorde
1st Ruddervoorde
7th Omloop Het Volk
1997
1st Hasselt-Spa-Hasselt
1st Zellik-Galmaarden
1st Grand Prix de Denain
1st Belsele-Puivelde
1st Izegem
1998
1st Deinze
1st Paris–Bourges
4th E3 Prijs Vlaanderen
2nd GP Ouest France - Plouay
1999
1st Aalst
1st Profronde van Maastricht
1st  Belgian National Road Race Championships
1st Stage 11 Tour de France
2000
Deurne
2001
1st Profronde van Almelo
5th De Brabantse Pijl
8th Tour of Flanders
6th Paris–Roubaix
10th Scheldeprijs
Deurne
2002
1st Peer
2003
1st Grand Prix d'Ouverture La Marseillaise
1st Boom
2005
1st Wilrijk
1st Tessenderlo
10th Omloop Het Volk

See also
 List of doping cases in cycling

References

External links

Official Tour de France results for Ludo Dierckxsens

1964 births
Living people
Belgian male cyclists
Belgian Tour de France stage winners
Doping cases in cycling
People from Geel